Robert Allan "Bob" Kiesel (August 30, 1911 – August 6, 1993) was an American sprinter who won a gold medal in 4 × 100 m relay at the 1932 Summer Olympics. He worked for a paint manufacturing company until 1941, then served in the U.S. Army, then spent 23 years in the family real estate and investment business in Utah, and finally settled on his farm in Idaho.

References 

1911 births
1993 deaths
American male sprinters
Athletes (track and field) at the 1932 Summer Olympics
Olympic gold medalists for the United States in track and field
Medalists at the 1932 Summer Olympics
Track and field athletes from Sacramento, California
United States Army personnel of World War II